Yirisleydi Lisbet Ford Carnonell (born 18 August 1991 in Sancti Spíritus) is a Cuban athlete specialising in the hammer throw.

She competed at the 2015 World Championships in Beijing, narrowly missing the final.
 
Her personal best in the event is 72.40 metres set in Havana in 2015.

Competition record

References

External links
http://www.all-athletics.com/node/109982
http://results.toronto2015.org/IRS/en/athletics/athlete-profile-n10155594-ford-yirisleydi.htm
http://www.espn.com/olympics/summer/2016/athletes/_/athlete/55094
https://www.reuters.com/article/olympics-athletics-women-results-idUSISS862925
http://www.gettyimages.com/pictures/yirisleydi-ford-15001672#yirisleydi-ford-of-cuba-competes-in-the-womens-hammer-throw-round-on-picture-id589032240

Cuban female hammer throwers
Living people
People from Sancti Spíritus
1991 births
World Athletics Championships athletes for Cuba
Athletes (track and field) at the 2015 Pan American Games
Athletes (track and field) at the 2016 Summer Olympics
Olympic athletes of Cuba
Central American and Caribbean Games medalists in athletics
Pan American Games competitors for Cuba